Baby Face Harrington is a 1935 American comedy film directed by Raoul Walsh and written by Nunnally Johnson, Edwin H. Knopf and Charles Lederer. The film stars Charles Butterworth, Una Merkel, Harvey Stephens, Eugene Pallette and Nat Pendleton. The film was released on April 12, 1935, by Metro-Goldwyn-Mayer.

Plot
Millicent (Una Merkel) wants her husband Willie (Charles Butterworth) to make a success of himself, the way her old beau Ronald (Harvey Stephens) did. In the belief what she wants most is money, Willie cashes in a life-insurance policy in exchange for $2,000 in cash, which he promptly loses.

When he sees real-estate agent Skinner (Donald Meek) with that much money, not long after having spoken with him, Willie knows who's robbed him. Meanwhile, a professional thief, Rocky Banister (Nat Pendleton), is terrifying everyone in town with his daring robberies, worrying Millicent so much that she keeps a gun nearby.

Borrowing the gun, Willie confronts Skinner and takes the $2,000. When he returns home, Willie discovers that his money has been in his wallet all along. Before he can return it to Skinner and apologize, Rocky breaks in and steals all $4,000.

Willie is accused of being an accomplice of Rocky's and sent to jail. During a breakout, Willie manages to leave a note behind for the police, who catch up just in time to apprehend Rocky and proclaim Willie a hero.

Cast 

 Charles Butterworth as Willie
 Una Merkel as Millicent
 Harvey Stephens as Ronald
 Eugene Pallette as Uncle Henry
 Nat Pendleton as Rocky
 Ruth Selwyn as Dorothy
 Donald Meek as Skinner
 Dorothy Libaire as Edith
 Edward Nugent as Albert 
 Robert Livingston as George
 Stanley Fields as Mullens
 Raymond Brown as McGuire
 Wade Boteler as Glynn
 Bradley Page as Dave
 Richard Carle as Judge Forbes
 G. Pat Collins as Hank
 Claude Gillingwater as Colton

References

External links 
 
 
 
 

1935 films
American comedy films
1935 comedy films
Metro-Goldwyn-Mayer films
Films directed by Raoul Walsh
Films with screenplays by Charles Lederer
American black-and-white films
Films scored by Edward Ward (composer)
1930s English-language films
1930s American films